Archidendropsis is a genus of flowering plants in the family Fabaceae.

Selected species
 Archidendropsis glandulosa
 Archidendropsis lentiscifolia
 Archidendropsis paivana
 Archidendropsis thozetiana
 Archidendropsis xanthoxylon

References

 
Fabaceae genera
Taxonomy articles created by Polbot